All Mixed Up: Los Remixes (English: All Mixed Up: The Remixes) is the first remix album and third album by Mexican-American cumbia group A.B. Quintanilla y Los Kumbia Kings and the first remix album by Mexican-American musician A.B. Quintanilla. It was released on October 29, 2002 by EMI Latin.

Track listing

Personnel
Kumbia Kings
 A.B. Quintanilla III – bass guitar, backing vocals, producer, composer
 Jason "DJ Kane" Cano – vocals, rap, vocal arrangement, composer
 Francisco "Cisko" Bautista Jr. – vocals
 Andrew "Drew" Maes – vocals
 Cruz Martínez – keyboards, producer, composer
 Alex Ramírez – keyboards
 Roy "Slim" Ramírez – percussion, backing vocals
 Frankie Aranda – percussion
 Jesse "O'Jay" Martínez – drums

Additional musicians and production
 Sergio Angon – design
 DJ Laz – vocals (track 11)
 Sheila E. – percussion (track 2)
 Mike Frost – design
 Luigi Giraldo – engineer, vocal arrangement, production coordination, mixing, composer
 Juan Carlos "JC" Hinojosa – A&R direction
 Brian "Red" Moore – mixing
 Organized Rhymes – vocals (track 5)
 Armando "Pitbull" Pérez – vocals (track 11)
 Miguel Trujillo – art director
 Norma Vivanco – assistant art director

Sales and certifications

References

2002 remix albums
Kumbia Kings albums
A. B. Quintanilla albums
Albums produced by A.B. Quintanilla
Albums produced by Cruz Martínez
EMI Records remix albums
Spanish-language remix albums
Cumbia albums
Albums recorded at Q-Productions